Luigi Campanella (4 November 1918 – 6 June 2018) was an Italian wrestler. He competed in the men's Greco-Roman featherweight at the 1948 Summer Olympics.

References

External links
 

1918 births
2018 deaths
Italian male sport wrestlers
Olympic wrestlers of Italy
Wrestlers at the 1948 Summer Olympics
Sportspeople from Genoa